Route 63 is a state highway on the island of Oahu in Honolulu County, Hawaii, United States, that is one of three main highways passing through the Koolau mountain.



Route description
The highway passes through the Wilson Tunnel, and takes commuters from the towns of Kāneohe and Kailua on the windward (northeast) side of the island, through Kalihi Valley into Honolulu on the leeward (south) side of the island.  The other trans-Koolau highways are Pali Highway and Interstate H-3. There is a runaway truck ramp on the highway.

Likelike Highway (pronounced LEE-kay-LEE-kay) is named after Hawaiian Princess Miriam Likelike, sister of King David Kalākaua.

Names of Route 63
 Likelike Highway from Kāneohe to Interstate H-1
 Kalihi Street south of Interstate H-1

Major intersections

Gallery

See also

 List of state highways in Hawaii
 List of highways numbered 63

References

External links

0063
Transportation in Honolulu County, Hawaii
Transportation in Honolulu